Colaspina is a genus of leaf beetles in the subfamily Eumolpinae. It contains only one species, Colaspina saportae, known from Spain and southern France (Provence). The species was first described from Aix-en-Provence in 1863 by Auguste Jean François Grenier, who dedicated it to the Marquess of Saporta. It has recently been suggested that Colaspina is possibly a sister genus to both Chalcosicya and Mediterranean Colaspidea combined.

References

Eumolpinae
Beetles of Europe
Monotypic Chrysomelidae genera
Taxa named by Julius Weise